The city of Bern, Switzerland, has 130 urban parks and 95 public playgrounds with a total surface area of . These venues are maintained by the City Nursery (Stadtgärtnerei).

Principal parks

Inner City
In the Old City, the most prominent green spaces are those on the sunny southern ridge of the Old City peninsula. From west to east, these are the Kleine Schanze, the Bundesterrasse, the privately owned Casinoterrasse and the Münsterplattform.

Bundesterrasse
The Bundesterrasse (Federal Terrace) is the terrace on the south, Aar-facing front of the Federal Palace of Switzerland, the building housing the Swiss federal parliament and several federal executive departments. The terrace follows the ridge of the Old City peninsula from the Kleine Schanze in the west to the Hotel Bellevue Palace and the Kirchenfeldbrücke in the east.

List of parks

This partial list is taken from the website of the City Nursery. Coordinates are derived from the city GIS.

External links

References

Bern
Bern
Parks